Fingerprint Recorders was a recording studio owned by Mark Heard, where he recorded most of his own records. The studio was located in Montrose, California.

Many other artists also recorded there from time to time, including those that were on Heard's record label, Fingerprint Records. Albums that have at least in part been recorded at Fingerprint include albums by The Choir, Randy Stonehill and Phil Keaggy.

Country producer and musician Buddy Miller started his career as an engineer for Heard at Fingerprint Recorders.

Albums recorded at Fingerprint Records
These albums were recorded, some only in part, at Fingerprint Records:
 Mark Heard - Ashes and Light, 1984
 Randy Stonehill - Celebrate this Heartbeat, 1984
 Mark Heard - Mosaics, 1985
 Randy Stonehill - Love Beyond Reason, 1985
 iDEoLA - Tribal Opera, 1987
 Randy Stonehill - Return to Paradise, 1989
 Mark Heard - Dry Bones Dance, 1990
 Randy Stonehill - Until We Have Wings, 1990
 Mark Heard - Second Hand, 1991
 Mark Heard - Satellite Sky, 1992
 The Choir - Kissers and Killers, 1993
 Mark Heard - High Noon, 1993
 Phil Keaggy - Phil Keaggy and Sunday's Child, 1988
 Mark Heard - Mystery Mind, 2000

Recording studios in California